Eduardo Alfredo Sacheri (born Castelar, 13 December 1967) is an Argentine writer and professor of History, graduated in the National University of Luján. He is best known for his novel La pregunta de sus ojos which became the basis for the Oscar-winning film El secreto de sus ojos and its American remake. Sacheri co-wrote the film's script in collaboration with its director Juan Jose Campanella. Sacheri and Campanella were also the screenwriters of the animation film Underdogs. He also published a number of short stories, such as Esperándolo a Tito y otros cuentos de fútbol and Lo raro empezó después.

In 2016, Sacheri won the Premio Alfaguara for his novel La noche de la usina. The novel was later adapted for cinema as the film, Heroic Losers, directed by Sebastián Borensztein and co-written by Sacheri.

Works

Novels 

 La pregunta de sus ojos (2005)
 Aráoz y la verdad (2008)
 Papeles en el viento (2011)
 Ser feliz era esto (2014)
 La noche de la Usina (2016)
 Lo mucho que la amé  (2019)

Short story collections 

 Esperándolo a Tito y otros cuentos de fútbol, AKA Los traidores y otros cuentos (2000). Contains 14 short stories:
 "Esperándolo a Tito"
 "Me van a tener que disculpar"
 "La promesa"
 "Valla invicta"
 "De chilena"
 "El cuadro del Raulito"
 "Jugar con una Tango es algo mucho más difícil de lo que a primera vista se podría suponer"
 "Independiente, mi viejo y yo"
 "Ultimo hombre"
 "Angel cabeceador"
 "La hipotética resurrección de Baltasar Quiñones"
 "Decisiones"
 "El sueño de Nicoletti"
 "Los traidores"
 Te conozco, Mendizábal y otros cuentos (2001). Contains 18 short stories:
 "Te conozco, Mendizábal"
 "Nunca tuve suerte con las mujeres"
 "El hombre"
 "Decí que el Carozo es un tipo de recursos"
 "La última visita de Edmundo Sánchez"
 "Matar el tiempo"
 "Acabo de mirar el reloj"
 "Ahí viene caminando Andrés"
 "Confesión de amor en la parada del 93"
 "El castigo"
 "Estimado doctor"
 "Cruzar el puente"
 "Las precauciones necesarias"
 "Encuentros clandestinos"
 "9 de diciembre de 1824"
 "Mi abuelo sabía mucho de fútbol"
 "Mi mujer es una persona sumamente discreta"
 "El piloto de combate"
 Lo raro empezó después y otros cuentos (2003). Contains 19 short stories:
 "Lo raro empezó después"
 "Un verano italiano"
 "Los informes de Evaristo Romero"
 "El golpe del Hormiga"
 "Cerrantes y la tentación"
 "Lunes"
 "El apogalipsis según el Chato"
 "El retorno de Vargas"
 "Reuniones de egresados"
 "Hechizo indio"
 "Motorola"
 "La multiplicación de Elenita"
 "Por Achával nadie daba dos mangos"
 "Un buen lugar para esperar sin prisa"
 "Correo"
 "Segovia y el quinto gol"
 "El rulo y la muerte"
 "Geografía de Tercero"
 "Fotos viejas"
 Un viejo que se pone de pie y otros cuentos (2007). Contains 14 short stories:
 "Un viejo que se pone de pie"
 "Frío"
 "En paz descansa"
 "El apellido terminaba con A"
 "Pericón"
 "Bicicletas"
 "Topadoras"
 "Fuego"
 "Montes, en el patio"
 "Valperga"
 "Volver"
 "Señor Pastoriza"
 "Los miércoles de Urrutia"
 "Una sonrisa exactamente así"
 Los dueños del mundo (2012). Contains 17 short stories:
 "Pelotas perdidas"
 "Colectivos"
 "El diablo con una sola media"
 "La casa abandonada"
 "Bicicletas I. Introducción"
 "Bicicletas II. El factor humano"
 "Bicicletas III. Cemento fresco"
 "Bicicletas IV. La espiral de violencia"
 "Ferrocarriles"
 "La laguna"
 "Figuritas"
 "Curso de ingreso"
 "Navidades I. Rompeportones"
 "Navidades II. La casita"
 "Navidades III. Anticapitalismo"
 "Carnavales"
 "El mejor gol de mi vida"
 La vida que pensamos. Cuentos de fútbol (2013). Contains 23 short stories:
 "Esperándolo a Tito"
 "De chilena"
 "El cuadro de Raulito"
 "Me van a tener que disculpar"
 "Decisiones"
 "El golpe del Hormiga"
 "La promesa"
 "Motorola"
 "Lo raro empezó después"
 "Un verano italiano"
 "Independiente, mi viejo y yo"
 "Por Achával nadie daba dos mangos"
 "Jugar con una Tango es algo mucho más difícil de lo que a primera vista se podría suponer"
 "Un viejo que se pone de pie"
 "El apogalipsis según el Chato"
 "Señor Pastoriza"
 "Los traidores"
 "El castigo"
 "Una sonrisa exactamente así"
 "Feliz cumpleaños"
 "Benito en cuatro meses"
 "La vida que pensamos"
 "Dominó"

Nonfiction 

Article collections
 Las llaves del reino (2015)
 El fútbol, de la mano (2017)

References

External links

 
 Books of Eduardo Sacheri on Google Books

1967 births
Living people
Argentine writers
People from Buenos Aires Province
Argentine dramatists and playwrights
Argentine people of Italian descent
Argentine educators
21st-century Argentine short story writers